Bev Craig is a Labour councillor in Burnage, Manchester, England, and Leader of Manchester City Council.

Craig was elected Leader of Manchester City Council by the ruling Labour group of councillors in October 2021, and officially succeeded Richard Leese at a full meeting of the council on his retirement on 1 December 2021.

Biography

Craig is originally from Belfast and is the city council’s first female and LGBT leader. She grew up on a council estate just outside Belfast and moved to Manchester from Northern Ireland in 2003. She told the BBC: "I grew up in social housing and my family still rely on it. I know the value of [what] the safety net of a good quality home can give you when times are tough." and that she wanted "to reach a point where me being a woman and being gay is entirely uninteresting and unremarkable".

She graduated from Manchester University in 2007 with a degree in politics and modern history and later gaining a postgraduate in Local Government Management from Warwick Business School and a MA in public policy and governance from UoM, both whilst working full time. She has held a range of jobs across local government, higher education and working for the trade union UNISON.

Before she was appointed as deputy leader of the council in May 2021, she spent four years as executive member for adult services, health, wellbeing and inclusion. She was also  deputy chair of Manchester Health and Care Commissioning and co-chair of the Manchester Local Care Organisation.

References

Living people
Labour Party (UK) councillors
Councillors in Manchester
Leaders of local authorities of England
Politicians from Belfast
English LGBT politicians
LGBT politicians from Northern Ireland
1985 births
21st-century LGBT people from Northern Ireland
Women councillors in England
Members of the Greater Manchester Combined Authority